Angelo Iacono b. 1973 first elected in 2015 as Liberal member for Alfred-Pellan, Quebec.
 Tony Ianno b. 1957 first elected in 1993 as Liberal member for Trinity—Spadina, Ontario.
 Lori Idlout first elected in 2021 as New Democratic Party member for Nunavut, Nunavut. 
 Marci Ien b. 1969 first elected in 2020 as Liberal member for Toronto Centre, Ontario.
 David Iftody b. 1956 first elected in 1993 as Liberal member for Provencher, Manitoba.
 Michael Ignatieff first elected in 2006 as Liberal member for Etobicoke—Lakeshore, Ontario
 James Lorimer Ilsley b. 1894 first elected in 1926 as Liberal member for Hants—Kings, Nova Scotia.
 Andrew B. Ingram b. 1851 first elected in 1891 as Liberal-Conservative member for Elgin East, Ontario.
 James Innes b. 1833 first elected in 1882 as Liberal member for Wellington South, Ontario.
 David Irvine b. 1831 first elected in 1881 as Liberal member for Carleton, New Brunswick.
 George Irvine b. 1826 first elected in 1867 as Conservative member for Mégantic, Quebec.
 John Alfred Irvine b. 1912 first elected in 1963 as Progressive Conservative member for London, Ontario.
 William Irvine b. 1885 first elected in 1921 as Labour Party member for East Calgary, Alberta.
 Aemilius Irving b. 1823 first elected in 1874 as Liberal member for Hamilton, Ontario.
 Ron Irwin b. 1936 first elected in 1980 as Liberal member for Sault Ste. Marie, Ontario.
 Thomas Irwin b. 1889 first elected in 1957 as Social Credit member for Burnaby—Richmond, British Columbia.
 Joseph Gaston Isabelle b. 1920 first elected in 1965 as Liberal member for Gatineau, Quebec.
 Gordon Benjamin Isnor b. 1885 first elected in 1935 as Liberal member for Halifax, Nova Scotia.
 Peter Ittinuar b. 1950 first elected in 1979 as New Democratic Party member for Nunatsiaq, Northwest Territories.
 William Bullock Ives b. 1841 first elected in 1878 as Conservative member for Richmond—Wolfe, Quebec.

I